Radio Monte Carlo (RMC) is the name of radio stations owned and managed by several different entities:

RMC (France) is a French-speaking station, broadcasting in France and Monaco owned by NextRadioTV.
RMC Sport, a French bouquet of paid TV sport channels, launched on 7 June 2016 as SFR Sport and rebranded as RMC Sport on 3 July 2018:
RMC Sport 1, flagship channel
RMC Sport 2, multisports
RMC Sport 3, extreme sports and equitation
RMC Sport 4, combat sport
RMC Sport Live 5-16, additional channels to broadcast live matches
RMC Découverte and RMC Story, two digital free-to-air TV channels focused on talk-shows and documentaries
Radio Monte Carlo Network is an Italian-speaking station, broadcasting in Italy and Monaco from both Monaco and Milan, and owned by Mediaset. Radio Monte Carlo was founded in 1966 by Noel Cutisson and its enlisted deejays included: Antonio Devia, Awanagana, Ettore Andenna, Gigi Salvadori, Herbert Pagani, Liliana Dell'Acqua, Luisella Berrino, Manuela De Vito, Marco Odino, Mario Raffaele Conti, Max Pagani, Riccardo Heinen, Roberto Arnaldi, Valeria Porrà, and others. Nowadays deejays are: Paolo Remondini, Alberto Capozzella, Luisella Berrino, Maurizio Di Maggio, Massimo Valli, Max Venegoni, Patrizia Farchetto, Marco Porticelli, "Jackie", Nick "The Nightfly", David Dunn, Kay Rush, "Katamashi", Stefano Bragatto, Monica Sala, Clive Malcolm Griffiths, Mauro Pellegrino and Erina Martelli.
Monte Carlo 2 (MC2) is the second Italian-speaking station, formerly associated with RMC Radio Monte Carlo Network broadcasting in Italy and Monaco.
Radio Monte Carlo (Switzerland) was a German-speaking station broadcasting from Zurich, Switzerland. It ceased in 2014 following bankruptcy of Music First Network AG
Radio Monte Carlo (Russia) is broadcasting from Moscow (102.1 fm), Saint Petersburg (105.9 fm), Rostov-on-Don (103.7 fm), Kaliningrad (100.9 fm), Vyborg (99.8 fm), Syzran (92.9 fm), Balakovo (96.6 fm) and Nakhodka (106.7 fm). This is the Russian-speaking radio station which broadcasts modern, new age, and semi classic music along with news and other broadcasts. At 2008-2010 was broadcasting contemporary lounge and house music and remixes.
Radio Monte Carlo International was an English language station on 205 metres on the mediumwave. Launched on December 1, 1970 with British DJs Tommy Vance and Dave Cash with contemporary pop music and considered at the time as a rival of Radio Luxembourg's English programming. 
Radio Monte Carlo Doualiya is an Arabic-speaking station, broadcasting throughout the Middle East and North Africa.
Radio Monte Carlo (Uruguay) - Montevideo, Uruguay is a Spanish-speaking station broadcast on 930AM.
Radio Monte Carlo (Georgia)

Perception

Radio Monte Carlo is considered one of the most popular networks especially in non-European Italian and French-speaking regions for its assumed neutrality. During the Iraq War, it was mentioned by some journalists as a reliable source.
Radio Monte Carlo was founded by the Nazis in March 1942, ceased transmission in June 1944 and was back on the air with American help as a joint venture with the Principality of Monaco in August 1944. In 1998, the French government sold its share to a private holding group made up of Sud Radio and la Depeche du Midi.

Broadcasts in other languages

Radio Monte Carlo's transmission network includes some high power Longwave and Mediumwave transmitters located at Roumoules in France. For many years the MW unit has been hired out at nighttime to the Middle East Reformed Fellowship through Trans World Radio, with programming in various languages including Arabic and English. In 1970, RMC's transmitters were also used by the short lived British commercial album station Radio Geronimo.

The World Tomorrow broadcast

During the late 1950s The World Tomorrow radio broadcast of Herbert W. Armstrong was carried by Radio Monte Carlo in the English, Spanish and Russian languages. Armstrong claimed that while the Voice of America was jammed by the Soviet Union, his Russian-language broadcast was heard loud and clear in Moscow. The Medium wave transmitter of RMC carries mostly Trans World Radio programming during evening hours.

Transmitters 
 Transmitter Roumoules
 Col de La Madonne
 Fontbonne

External links

 Radio Monte Carlo Network (IT)

Radio stations established in 1950
International radio networks
International broadcasters
Multilingual broadcasters
Radio in France
Radio stations in Italy
Radio stations in Russia
Mediaset